Patrick Ford may refer to:
Sir Patrick Ford, 1st Baronet (1880–1945), Scottish Unionist Party politician
Patrick Ford (journalist) (died 1913), Irish-American journalist and land reformer
Patrick O. Ford (1942–1968), United States Navy sailor and Navy Cross recipient
Patrick W. Ford (1847–1900), Irish-American architect
Patrick Ford (boxer) (1955–2011), Guyanese and British Commonwealth featherweight boxer
Patrick F. Ford Jr. or James Meredith (1872–1915), Medal of Honor recipient

See also
Pat Ford (disambiguation)
Patrick Forde (disambiguation)
Ford (surname)